Beitar al-Amal Nazareth is an Arab-Israeli football club based in Nazareth. The club currently plays in Liga Gimel Jezreel division.

History
The club was founded on 25 March 1964 Nazareth by George kharma as a vehicle for Catholic action. Under the guidance of Kharma, who also served as team manager and coach throughout the club's existence, the team joined the Israel football association in 1965–66 and played in Liga Gimel under the name "The Catholic Action Club". At the end of the season the club joined the Beitar organization and took the name Beitar al-Amal Nazareth. The team played mainly in the bottom divisions, and was promoted twice to Liga Bet, in 1979 and 1982, only managing a single season in Liga Bet in each season.

Honours

League

External links
Beitar al-Amal Nazareth The Israel Football Association

References

Arab Israeli culture
Nazareth
Nazareth
Association football clubs established in 1964
1964 establishments in Israel